Christopher Lee Cook (born September 1, 1976) is an American IFBB professional bodybuilder.

He served in the United States Air Force. Chris Cook's first bodybuilding competition was in 1996, where he placed 1st in the heavy weight division and Overall in the NPC (National Physique Committee) Mr. Anchorage.  His first IFBB event was in The New York Cup of 2005, where he placed 6th.  In 2006 he competed in the Arnold Classic and the Ironman Pro Invitational, both for the first time, and placed 15th and 10th respectively.  Chris Cook has been featured in many fitness and bodybuilding articles, including being featured on the cover of FLEX magazine, Muscle and Fitness, MuscleMag International, and Muscular Development.

Stats
 Height: 5'10 
 Off-season weight: 295 lbs
 Competition weight: 250 lbs

Contest history 
 1996 NPC Mr. Anchorage, 1st and Overall
 1997 NPC Mr. Alaska, Heavyweight, 4th
 1997 NPC Emerald Cup, Junior, 2nd
 1999 NPC Mr. Alaska, Heavyweight, 1st
 1999 NPC Emerals Cup, Heavyweight, 2nd
 2000 NPC Sacramento, Heavyweight, 1st
 2000 NPC Nationals, Heavyweight Did not place
 2002 NPC California Championships, Super-Heavyweight, 3rd
 2003 NPC USA Championships, Super-Heavyweight, 1st
 2004 NPC Nationals, Super-Heavyweight, 1st and Overall
 2004 NPC USA Championships, Super-Heavyweight, 1st
 2005 New York Pro Championships, 6th
 2005 Toronto Pro Invitational, 10th
 2006 Arnold Classic, 15th
 2006 Ironman Pro Invitational, 10th
 2006 San Francisco Pro Invitational, 12th

Filmography 
 2004: Malcolm in the Middle, episode Buseys Run Away as Nick, the bodybuilder

See also 
 List of male professional bodybuilders
 Arnold Classic
 Mr. Olympia

References

External links 
Chris Cook's photographs

1976 births
American bodybuilders
Living people
Professional bodybuilders
United States Air Force airmen